The Metro Manila Skyway, officially the Metro Manila Skyway System (MMSS) or simply the Skyway, is an elevated highway which is the main expressway in Metro Manila, Philippines. It connects the North and South Luzon Expressways (NLEX and SLEX) with access to Ninoy Aquino International Airport via the NAIA Expressway (NAIAX).

The expressway runs above major existing highways in Metro Manila and the San Juan River. It passes through the highly urbanized areas of Caloocan, Quezon City, Manila, Makati, Pasay, Taguig, Parañaque, and Muntinlupa, easing congestion on other major thoroughfares. The Skyway is accessible to Class 1 vehicles, such as cars, vans, motorcycles above , pick-up trucks, and SUVs, and Class 2 vehicles and public utility vehicles (PUVs). Previously, Class 2 vehicles and PUVs were banned due to the construction of the extension project.

Route 

The Skyway connects the North and South Luzon Expressways. It runs above several major roads in Metro Manila, with strategically located entry and exit ramps. The expressway is divided into stages. Stage 3 runs from the North Luzon Expressway, near its Balintawak toll plaza in Caloocan, to Buendia exit in Makati; Stage 1 runs from Buendia to Bicutan in Parañaque, and Stage 2 runs from Bicutan to South Station (Alabang-Zapote) Exit in Alabang, Muntinlupa, and the South Luzon Expressway (SLEX) Elevated Extension, formerly and also known as the Skyway Extension, from the Skyway Main Line toll plaza to the South Luzon Expressway near Soldiers Hills in Muntinlupa. Stages 1 and 2 are known as the South Metro Manila Skyway Project. From 1998 to 2020, the Skyway was a dual three-lane elevated carriageway for most of its length (six lanes, three in each direction) separated by a median barrier until it was expanded to seven lanes from Alabang to Balintawak after the construction of Skyway Stage 3 and the SLEX Elevated Extension. In addition, Stage 3's  segment from the future San Juan Interchange near the San Juan River to Plaza Dilao exit in Manila will be utilized by the future Pasig River Expressway (PAREX).

A possible connection to a future toll road to New Manila International Airport in Bulacan is at that exit. It enters Quezon City and after rising above the Balintawak Interchange (where it crosses EDSA), it turns east towards Circumferential Road 3 (C-3), particularly Sgt. Rivera and G. Araneta Avenues. The expressway runs south above Araneta Avenue until it reaches the San Juan River. The Skyway follows the river to its mouth at the Pasig River in Manila before turning towards the San Miguel Yamamura packaging plant (owned by Skyway concessionaire San Miguel Corporation) in Pandacan. There, it will meet PAREX and the  elevated connecting road to the NLEX Connector in Santa Mesa that will branch off parallel to the Philippine National Railways (PNR) tracks. The main expressway turns east onto Tomas Claudio Street (Paco–Santa Mesa Road) and Nagtahan Link Bridge towards Quirino Avenue (C-2). It then turns towards Osmeña Highway and enters Makati, where the Buendia exit is located.

The expressway rises above the Magallanes Interchange and returns to its original level after crossing EDSA. After its interchange with NAIAX, it descends to ground level because of height restrictions on structures near Ninoy Aquino International Airport and parallels SLEX and the PNR tracks at the Pasay–Taguig boundary. The Skyway again rises near the C-5 Exit and Arca South, entering Parañaque. From Bicutan, at the start of Stage 2, it runs above SLEX. At the Sucat Exit, the Skyway rises above the east end of Dr. A. Santos Avenue and descends as it approaches the main toll plaza in Cupang, Muntinlupa. After the toll plaza, it meets the SLEX Elevated Extension which connects it to SLEX past the Alabang Viaduct, narrows to three lanes, and curves west before joining Alabang–Zapote Road near South Station in Alabang. The extension runs parallel to SLEX along the shoulder of the Alabang viaduct and Manila South Road, crossing the Alabang and Filinvest exits and descending to merge with SLEX near Pleasant Village and Soldiers Hills.

History 

In 1993, the Japan International Cooperation Agency (JICA) conducted a study on the proposed urban expressway system in Metro Manila, the master plan for the planned network was meant to have 150 kilometers of expressways, including a route on the Radial Road 3 alignment from Quirino Avenue in Manila to Alabang in Muntinlupa, which is the total length of 20 kilometers.        

Jakarta-based investor Citra Lamtoro Gung Persada (CITRA), owned by Siti Hardiyanti Rukmana (a daughter of Indonesian President Suharto), signed a Supplemental Toll Operation Agreement (STOA) in November 1995 with the Toll Regulatory Board (TRB) as a grantor and the Philippine National Construction Corporation (PNCC) as operator. Negotiations began on October 31, 1994, with a group composed of representatives from the Board of Investments (BOI), the Department of Finance (DOF), AIA Capital as a financial adviser, the Department of Public Works and Highways (DPWH), the TRB, the PNCC, and CITRA. Under the STOA, Citra Metro Manila Tollways Corporation (CMMTC) was mandated to finance, design, and construct Stage 1 of the South Metro Manila Tollway Project (an elevated expressway from Bicutan to Buendia) and rehabilitate the at-grade portion of the South Metro Manila Tollway project from Magallanes to Alabang. The STOA was approved by Philippine President Fidel V. Ramos in April 1996.

Stage 1 

Construction of Stage 1 began on November 28, 1995, and it was inaugurated by then-president Joseph Estrada on December 10, 1998 and officially opened in January 1999 as the initial tolls started. The girder launching technology was used during the construction. Special girder launchers were used to lift the girders, minimizing the traffic disruption along the South Luzon Expressway. The Buendia, Makati (now Amorsolo), Magallanes, and Bicutan exits, as well as Skyway Toll Plazas A and B, were the first to be completed; the Don Bosco exit started its construction on November 17, 2001, and opened on January 3, 2002, and the NAIA Interchange was constructed from March 17, 2004, to the completion date on May 30, 2009. CMMTC spent US$32.7 million on the  portion of Stage 1.

Stage 2 
On April 2, 2009, CITRA announced construction of the second stage; by June of that year, new pillars were constructed. The stage was half done by May 2010, rotating the highest pierhead in the Sucat area. The stage was 65% done by July, with 134 of the 238 spans concreted and the asphalt overlay begun. On December 15, 2010, the Bicutan–Sucat portion of Stage 2 opened to the public. Motorists could use this portion free of charge for one week, when Skyway tolls were reduced to its 2007 rates. On April 6, 2011, the Hillsborough ramps, Skyway Main Line toll plaza, and South Station exit were opened to the public toll-free until April 25.

Stage 3 

The Department of Public Works and Highways (DPWH) received an unsolicited proposal to construct a Skyway extension from San Miguel Corporation-backed Citra Metro Manila Tollways Corporation (CMMTC), which would run from Bicutan, Taguig to Balintawak, Quezon City. The DPWH subjected the proposal to a Swiss challenge, which requires a government agency that has received an unsolicited bid for a project to publish the bid and invite third parties to match (or exceed) it. The project was approved by President Benigno Aquino III in September 2013.

The groundbreaking ceremony of Skyway Stage 3 was held on January 22, 2014, and construction began on February 17. It was expected to be completed in 2017, but the project experienced construction delays. Work stoppages due to the COVID-19 pandemic further delayed the project's full opening until late 2020.

Originally planned as divided into four segments, the original route crossed the Pasig River, met the NLEX-SLEX Connector Road (the present-day NLEX Connector) near the PUP campus, and passed through Santa Mesa. Due to right-of-way issues, however, it could not traverse through Santa Mesa and instead made it turn right from Tomas Claudio Street through the San Miguel Yamamura Packaging Corporation plastic plant in Pandacan towards the San Juan River and to Gregorio Araneta Avenue. The new segment raised the possibility of further northward expansion.

Two significant accidents occurred during construction. On August 18, 2019, a coping beam collapsed on vehicles on the North Luzon Expressway, delaying southbound traffic; no injuries were reported. A February 1, 2020 fire at the San Miguel Yamamura Packaging Corporation plastic plant in Pandacan caused a  portion of Stage 3 to collapse, creating a long delay of the project. Fire damage required reconstruction of pierheads and replacement of the burnt girders, delaying the 2020 opening of the segment from April to November.

The northbound Buendia–Quirino portion opened on July 20, 2018. The Buendia–Plaza Dilao segment was partially opened toll-free on July 22, 2019, and the northbound exit ramp to Quirino Avenue opened on December 23 of that year. On October 13, 2020, San Miguel Corporation announced the final concrete pouring and completion of Skyway Stage 3. Due to rain, however, the asphalt overlay was delayed. On December 29, the remaining segment of Stage 3 (to NLEX) partially opened. It was inaugurated on January 14, 2021, and became fully operational the following day, toll-free until July 12. While work on the expressway was being completed, Stage 3 was closed daily from 10:00 pm to 5:00 am (PST) daily. The segment opened around the clock in August 2021. Some toll plazas and entrance and exit ramps were closed from April 5–8 and May 24–28 for system tests by the Toll Regulatory Board (TRB).

Work on the elevated  link connecting the Skyway with the NLEX Connector began on January 28, 2021, after delays due to right-of-way issues. Other entry and exit ramps were planned to open during the next few months. Toll collection began on July 12, 2021, after delays in toll approval and an operating permit.

SLEX Elevated Extension 

First proposed by San Miguel Corporation as the Skyway Extension Project in November 2017, the extension project planned to expand the two-lane section from the Skyway Main Line toll plaza to Alabang–Zapote Road to six lanes (three in each direction) and build an extension from South Station in Alabang to the South Luzon Expressway's Susana Heights exit in Muntinlupa. The SLEX Elevated Extension is the first phase of the corporation's three-year expansion project of all toll roads in southern Metro Manila to ease traffic congestion. In addition to ramps connecting the South Luzon Expressway section near Soldiers Hills and the Skyway main toll plaza, it will include construction of a northbound ramp connecting the Alabang viaduct to the South Station toll plaza and widening of the South Station toll plaza.

Construction of the extension began in August 2019. To facilitate the extension's construction, the Hillsborough ramps were closed and demolished; the northbound on-ramp was closed in 2020, followed by the southbound off-ramp on April 19, 2021. The extension was originally expected to be completed by December 2020. However, the COVID-19 pandemic and construction delays postponed the extension opening until 2021. A November 21, 2020 construction accident on the East Service Road in Barangay Cupang, Muntinlupa caused delays. The  northbound section of the project was finished on March 24, 2021, and was soft-opened (toll-free until further notice) on April 11. The  southbound section then opened on December 10. The extension was inaugurated on February 15, 2022, as the South Luzon Expressway (SLEX) Elevated Extension Project.

Operations and maintenance 
The Skyway is operated and maintained by the Skyway Operations and Maintenance Corporation (SOMCO). SOMCO took over the expressway's operations and maintenance from former operator PNCC Skyway Corporation in January 2008 and was declared to comply with the July 2007 Amended Supplemental Toll Operators Agreement (A-STOA) between the PNCC, Citra Metro Manila Tollways Corporation and the Toll Regulatory Board (TRB), which awarded management of the  road to Citra. The Skyway uses the Vendeka toll-collection system. SOMCO controls the Skyway three main operational functions: traffic safety and management, maintenance, and toll collection.

The expressway's concessionaire varies by stage. The concessionaire of Stages 1 and 2 (known as the South Metro Manila Skyway Project), including the at-grade portion of the South Luzon Expressway from Magallanes to Alabang, is SMC Skyway Corporation (formerly Citra Metro Manila Tollways Corporation, or CMMTC). The Stage 3 concessionaire is SMC Skyway Stage 3 Corporation (formerly Citra Central Expressway Corporation), a subsidiary of Stage 3 Connector Tollways Holding Corporation (S3CTH).

The aforementioned companies are subsidiaries of San Miguel Corporation through SMC Infrastructure, which is also the concessionaire of Skyway Extension or SLEX Elevated Extension Project.

Expansion and future plans

Skyway Stage 4

The Southeast Metro Manila Expressway (SEMME), also known as Skyway Stage 4, is a  under-construction expressway from Skyway Stage 2 near Arca South in Taguig to Batasan Road (near Batasang Pambansa Complex) in Quezon City. The expressway is planned to extend to Bulacan. The project aims to provide an alternate route to EDSA, C-5, and other major roads for motorists coming from Rizal and the Calabarzon area to ease traffic congestion. The project's groundbreaking ceremony was held on January 8, 2018, and it is expected to be completed by 2022.

New Manila International Airport link

As a part of San Miguel Corporation's New Manila International Airport (NMIA) project, the concessionaire proposed linking the airport to NLEX and SLEX via Skyway Stage 3. The section of NLEX between its Balintawak toll plaza and Skyway's Balintawak on- and off-ramps in Caloocan has pillars to connect the Skyway northward to a future toll road which will lead to the new airport in Bulakan, Bulacan. The project runs above a toll road operated by NLEX Corporation, another concessionaire.

The toll road project, later known as the Northern Access Link Expressway (NALEX), was approved by the Toll Regulatory Board in June 2022. Another  stretch would be built beyond the NMIA roundabout, ending at the southern end of the Tarlac–Pangasinan–La Union Expressway in Tarlac City. The NALEX project costs  and the first segment is targeted to be completed by 2026.

Bus rapid transit
According to San Miguel Corporation president and COO Ramon Ang, the company began considering bus rapid transit on the Skyway in 2017. The proposed system, announced on April 26, 2021, may have high-capacity point-to-point (P2P) buses, and will be sent to the Department of Transportation when finalized. It aims to make commutes safer and more convenient, maximizing the benefits of the elevated expressway in diverting vehicles from other roads.

Tolls 

The expressway combines open-road, closed-road, and barrier toll systems. Toll collection is divided between the South Metro Manila Skyway Project and Skyway Stage 3.

The South Metro Manila Skyway toll system is integrated with the South Luzon (SLEX) and Muntinlupa–Cavite Expressways (MCX). Northbound toll collection is at toll barriers upon entry, and exits have no toll collection. Northbound motorists entering the Skyway from SLEX in Muntinlupa pay a toll at the Main Line toll plaza in addition to the toll from their entry point at SLEX or MCX to the at-grade Alabang exit. Southbound tolls are collected at toll barriers when exiting from either Skyway, NAIAX, SLEX, MCX, or STAR Tollway. No tickets are issued at southbound entrances. SLEX Elevated Extension is toll-free until further notice, since its proposed toll plaza for northbound motorists from SLEX is yet to be constructed.

Stage 3 tolls are collected on entry and/or exit, based on distance and vehicle class. Northbound motorists from the South Metro Manila Skyway are charged a toll based on the distance travelled from the Buendia exit, while southbound vehicles heading past Buendia will have their tolls collected upon exit similar to southbound vehicles using South Skyway. Northbound motorists heading past Quezon Avenue will have their tolls collected at the Del Monte toll plaza before exiting at the Sgt. Rivera, A. Bonifacio, or Balintawak/NLEX off-ramp. Southbound motorists heading past the Sgt. Rivera exit will have their tolls collected at the Del Monte toll plaza before exiting at either Quezon Avenue or E. Rodriguez, and those heading past E. Rodriguez will have their tolls collected on exit. Toll collection on exit to the NLEX Connector (via elevated spur road in Manila) and Pasig River Expressway, respectively, are not yet determined.

The Skyway uses the RFID-based Autosweep electronic toll collection (ETC) system used on the expressways by San Miguel Tollways. Previously, the transponder-based E-Pass was used. ETC lanes are usually on the left lane of a toll plaza, but mixed lanes also accepting cash exist. More ETC lanes were added at toll barriers as Philippine tollways shift towards cashless toll collection. On the Skyway, RFID installation and reloading lanes are at the northbound Runway and the future Gil Puyat toll plazas. Cash is accepted only at South Skyway and some toll plazas of Stage 3.

Class 3 vehicles are currently not permitted to use the Skyway, and trucks are banned on Stage 3 due to safety concerns. The under-construction NLEX Connector is expected to compensate for the restriction, which will bypass the majority of Stage 3 to connect to South Skyway.

The toll rates are as follows:

South Metro Manila Skyway

Skyway Stage 3

Exits

Skyway 3–NLEX Connector link

See also
 Metro Manila Dream Plan

Notes

References

External links 

 Metro Manila Skyway Official Website

Toll roads in the Philippines
Roads in Metro Manila